Jurgita Jurkutė (born April 23, 1985) is a Lithuanian actress and former winner of the Miss Lithuania 2007 beauty pageant.

Biography 
Jurgita was student of Vilnius University for the Bachelor of Arts on social work. 2012 she graduated bachelor studies at Lithuanian Academy of Music and Theatre in Vilnius. Among her hobbies is football. She also works as a model, and has worked in Japan, Italy, Spain, Greece and Germany.

Jurgita believes that her current Miss Lithuania title is an opportunity for her to help others, especially children without families - "one day with our care they will find their true homes".

Jurgita represented Lithuania in Miss World 2007 contest in Sanya, China.

She landed the lead role in the TV series Moterys meluoja geriau ("Women lie better") in 2008. In 2009-2012 Jurgita Jurkutė hosted TV3 projects „Šok su manimi“ ("Dance with me") and "Chorų karai" ("Choir wars").

In 2014 April 1 during Vilnius International Film Festival she was awarded as Lithuanian actress of the year for the roles in Name in the Dark and Valentinas už 2rų.

Filmography

References

External links

1985 births
Living people
People from Plungė
Lithuanian female models
Miss World 2007 delegates
Lithuanian television presenters
Lithuanian television actresses
Lithuanian film actresses
Lithuanian beauty pageant winners
21st-century Lithuanian actresses
Lithuanian Academy of Music and Theatre alumni
Lithuanian women television presenters